Starkovo is a rural locality (a village) in Gorkinskoye Rural Settlement, Kirzhachsky District, Vladimir Oblast, Russia. The population was 3 as of 2010.

Geography 
Starkovo is located 17 km north of Kirzhach (the district's administrative centre) by road. Ivashevo is the nearest rural locality.

References 

Rural localities in Kirzhachsky District